Natalia Bamber-Laskowska (born 24 February 1982) is a Polish volleyball player, a member of Poland women's national volleyball team and Polish club BKS Stal Bielsko-Biała, European Champion 2005), bronze medalist of the European Championship 2009, Polish Champion (2006, 2010).

Personal life
On 19 June 2011 she married Jacek Laskowski, a sports commentator. In 2014, she gave birth to their first child.

Career

National team
In 2005 Bamber achieved title of European Champion, but she did not play because of injury. In October 2009 she won with teammates bronze medal of European Championship 2009 after winning match against Germany.

Sporting achievements

National team
 2005  CEV European Championship
 2009  CEV European Championship

State awards
 2005  Silver Cross of Merit

References

External links
 ORLENLiga player profile

1982 births
Living people
People from Sulechów
Sportspeople from Lubusz Voivodeship
Polish women's volleyball players
Recipients of the Silver Cross of Merit (Poland)